is a character and the main protagonist of Disney and Square Enix's Kingdom Hearts video game series. Introduced in the first Kingdom Hearts game in 2002, Sora is portrayed as a cheerful teenager who lives on the Destiny Islands and has been best friends with Riku and Kairi since childhood. When they plan to go on a journey to see other worlds, they are separated by creatures known as the Heartless, with Sora obtaining a weapon called the Keyblade. Donald Duck and Goofy then recruit him in their journey across various worlds to aid their king and his uncle, Mickey Mouse, while Sora searches for his friends. Along the way, the trio protects the worlds they visit from the Heartless and other villains.

Sora was initially designed by the Kingdom Hearts series director and character designer Tetsuya Nomura during a discussion between Disney and Square about who the series's protagonist should be. Wanting an original character, Nomura made various sketches of Sora until the design met the approval of Disney. Throughout the series, Sora has been voiced by Haley Joel Osment in the English version and Miyu Irino in the Japanese version. For his depiction as a child in the prequel Kingdom Hearts Birth by Sleep, Sora was voiced by Luke Manriquez and Takuto Yoshinaga in English and Japanese, respectively. Sora has made supporting appearances in other games from the series and reprised his role in manga and light novel adaptations of the games.

Sora's character has received a generally positive critical response due to his warm personality and adventurous spirit. His personal and martial growth in the series also received praise, especially in his appearance in Kingdom Hearts II. Since his debut in Kingdom Hearts, he has become popular among the video game community, with high rankings among character popularity polls. His prominence increased significantly in 2021 after he was added to Nintendo's fighting video game Super Smash Bros. Ultimate as a downloadable fighter and revealed to be the most requested fighter to appear in the Super Smash Bros. series.

Concept and creation

Original concept and design

Sora was designed by Tetsuya Nomura as the protagonist of Kingdom Hearts. He was not originally slated to be the protagonist, as Disney wanted Donald Duck to fill the role, while Square wanted Mickey Mouse. Nomura designed Sora with the concepts of the Disney characters in mind, basing his outfit on Mickey Mouse's trademark white gloves, red shorts and giant yellow shoes. Sora originally wielded a weapon resembling a chainsaw; however, the weapon was not well received by Disney, which led Nomura to redesign the weapon into a Keyblade. He was also designed with lion-like features, which were removed as the staff found them to be similar to those of Final Fantasy IX protagonist Zidane Tribal. The design was further reworked after a talk with the Disney staff, and Nomura finished it after a night's work. Because Sora was a new character in the first Kingdom Hearts, Square added Final Fantasy characters who support the protagonist.

One of the main concepts of Sora's character in the series is that, according to Nomura, he is a normal boy instead of a supernatural being, even though he is deeply connected with other characters from the series. With Sora, Nomura wants to give players the message that even though they are not "important people", they have the opportunity to accomplish great things. This was emphasized in Birth by Sleeps secret ending, which Nomura hoped players would find because it showed Sora's potential to influence everyone's lives. In early versions of development of Birth by Sleep, Nomura thought that Ventus would actually be Sora before being reborn, but due to negative feedback from overseas, that plot line was discarded. Nomura has stated that Sora's name can be interpreted as "sky", since the Japanese word  means sky. This name was also chosen to symbolize Sora's role and his personality, as well as his close relationship with Riku and Kairi, making their three names together "sky, land, and sea." He was also described by Nomura as having an outgoing personality, which allows him to make friends throughout the series. Of all of the characters he has designed, Nomura called Sora his favorite, describing him as "special" after having worked to develop the character over many games. The name of Noctis Lucis Caelum from Final Fantasy XV is also a reference to Sora; Sora and Caelum both mean "sky" in their respective languages, and Nomura considered Noctis to be his latest "son". When Kingdom Hearts II included a note using Sora's handwriting, Nomura wrote it himself.

Development
Following the first Kingdom Hearts, Nomura was worried that players would be unhappy that Sora would start Kingdom Hearts II as a weak character with few powers who once again had to be leveled up like the first title. Therefore, Nomura developed the plot of Chain of Memories to explain how Sora loses his abilities in Castle Oblivion and then starts anew. Additionally, a new mystery regarding Sora's memories of Twilight Town was added in Chain of Memories, which would be explained in Kingdom Hearts II. Sora was given a new outfit to reflect the time spent between Kingdom Hearts and Kingdom Hearts II. The team in charge of Kingdom Hearts II expressed difficulties in animating Sora's "Valor" Drive Form for having a completely different motion except in Sora's walking animation, which is shared with his regular motion. The Anti-Form was also made to focus on Sora's dark side from the first Kingdom Hearts, where he is temporarily transformed into a Heartless. Gameplaywise, the form was created to be both powerful and troublesome. The fights Sora has with Roxas and Xemnas were meant to surprise gamers, especially in the latter when the player loses control of Sora and has Riku to save him.

After finishing Kingdom Hearts II, Nomura wanted to give Sora a rest from the series in order to focus the following games on other characters from the series. Moreover, the events from the endings of Coded and Birth by Sleep hinted at a new mystery regarding Sora's character, which would be revealed in Kingdom Hearts III. Although Nomura stated in March 2010 that Sora would once again be the focus of the next title, Kingdom Hearts 3D: Dream Drop Distance, he stated that Sora would share it with another character with great importance. The switches between player characters Sora and Riku across the game are meant to contrast the style from Kingdom Hearts Birth By Sleep, which allowed the player to use three characters in their own campaigns, as well as to explain the word "Distance" in the title, because the two characters never interact across their stories. Nomura has stated that the themes of the game are trust and friendship, and that like Birth by Sleep, the story is on par with that of a numbered title. As a result of the game's plot, both Sora and Riku appear in their younger forms from the first Kingdom Hearts game. To avoid misconceptions that Dream Drop Distance was a remake of the original game, Nomura decided to change Sora's and Riku's outfits for most of the game.

In response to rumors saying that Sora's story would end in Kingdom Hearts III, Nomura answered that Sora is the protagonist of the series and that his role will end once the series ends. For this game, Nomura was interested in giving Sora a new costume, but was worried about doing so because of the popularity of the character's Kingdom Hearts II outfit. In the end, he decided to create a new one as Kingdom Hearts III was a new numbered title. Nomura also revealed that Sora is the same proportions as in previous games; however, they "muted the volume on his hair—it's not  wild." Regarding updating Sora's look from his Kingdom Hearts II design, Nomura noted that the basis for the resulting design is a mix between Sora's costumes for Kingdom Hearts II and Dream Drop Distance, one that is "a lot more sleek and sporty" since "Sora does a lot more... acrobatic [and]... action-oriented movements". Sora's new skills in Kingdom Hearts III were inspired by those of Terra from Kingdom Hearts II Final Mix and Birth by Sleep in order to surprise gamers with new powers related to the Keyblade, with other skills that were influenced by Sora's and Riku's powers from Dream Drop Distance. For the Monsters Inc. world, Nomura considered giving Sora a monster costume similar to the one Boo wears in the movie, but Pixar gave the idea to actually change Sora into a monster. Sora's final stage in Kingdom Hearts III was left ambiguous though Nomura suggested it might be related to the Square Enix game The World Ends With You.

According to Super Smash Bros. series director Masahiro Sakurai, Sora had been the winner of the Super Smash Bros. for 3DS and Wii U Fighter Ballot in 2015, and Sakurai was well aware of the various fan campaigns advocating for Sora's inclusion in the series. Sakurai described Sora's inclusion as a "huge undertaking" and "perfect" as the concluding fighter for Super Smash Bros. Ultimate. Sakurai also felt that it was "impossible" for Sora to appear in the series, but after Sakurai met a Disney executive at an awards show, Nintendo, Disney, and Square Enix began negotiations to include him. According to Luigi Priore, Vice President of Disney and Pixar Games, the company recognized that having Sora in Smash Bros. was something that fans had been asking for a long time, and the team was delighted to make it happen. "Knowing the passion of Kingdom Hearts fans, we were not surprised [by the reaction], but we were thrilled," Priore added. "It's been incredible watching all the videos and commentary online." Sora was designed as a floaty, light, and aerial fighter. The majority of his moves are inspired by his appearance in the original Kingdom Hearts, but per the limitations of the licensing agreement, Disney characters were not included as spirits or cameos.

In April 2022, During the interview with Nomura at Famitsu, he said that "Kingdom Hearts 4 will explore the contrast between the real world known as Quadratum and the fictional worlds of Kingdom Hearts". He further said that "Sora also looks more realistic due to him being in that world. However, if he were to return to his own world, his appearance would look similar to [how he would look with] the shaders used for Donald and Goofy."

Casting

Sora is voiced in Japanese by Miyu Irino, who used his normal voice for the beginning; Irino was filmed with cameras during voice recording to provide a reference for Sora's mouth movements. As Irino grew older, he struggled with sounding as young as Sora, who remained the same in Re:coded as his data form. By Kingdom Hearts III, Irino faced more issues during recordings of the game. After finishing the game, Irino wondered if he might properly portray Sora in sequels due to his age gap.

In English, the character is voiced by Haley Joel Osment. Due to Sora's lack of growth across the franchise, Osment faced the challenge of properly giving him the tone of a teenager; "I think he's a little bit older now [in Kingdom Hearts 3] than he was in Kingdom Hearts 1 and 2. But early on, you know, I started this when I was 12, and my voice had started to change and everything. So learning how to manipulate that and keep the voice sounding young while still preserving the range of emotions that Sora had; that was a unique challenge." In retrospect, Osment found the idea of ending Kingdom Hearts III as an emotional moment as, while the series is not ending with this installment, the narrative is giving a proper closure to the story started by the antagonist Xehanort.

Characteristics
Sora appears as a boy with spiky brown-hair who, when first introduced, wears a red shirt, red pants, and a white and blue jacket covered by keychains. Upon traveling to certain worlds, Sora's appearance is altered by Donald Duck's magic to adapt to different environments and keep his origin from another world a secret; for example, he turns into a merman in underwater environments. After undergoing significant growth in Kingdom Hearts II, Sora is provided with a new, black outfit by Flora, Fauna and Merryweather. When battling, Sora's outfit can change into other designs depending on the player's choices. During Kingdom Hearts II, Sora dual-wields Keyblades, their forms depending on the player's use of keychains.

Across the series, Sora is depicted as a cheerful teenager who cherishes his friendships and relies on them for his strength. As a result, several of Sora's enemies use his friends as bait to use the Keyblade for their purposes. During the first game, it is discovered that Sora was not meant to wield the Keyblade, which only chooses him in the absence of its intended owner, Riku. However, Sora's greater strength of heart causes the Keyblade to reject Riku in favor of Sora.

Appearances

In Kingdom Hearts series
In Kingdom Hearts, Sora, Riku and Kairi plan to leave their home on the Destiny Islands to explore new worlds. They are separated when the island is attacked by the Heartless; in the process, Sora obtains a Keyblade that he uses to eliminate the Heartless. Arriving in Traverse Town, Sora allies with Donald Duck and Goofy, who are under instruction from their missing king, Mickey Mouse, to follow the "key". The three travel across worlds in their Gummi Ship in search of their missing friends, sealing the worlds' "Keyholes" along the way to protect them from being consumed by the Heartless. They are opposed by an alliance of Disney villains led by Maleficent, who seeks out the seven Princesses of Heart to unlock the Keyhole that leads to "Kingdom Hearts", a repository of knowledge and power, and the source of all hearts. Riku, who has come under Maleficent's watch, fights with Sora on several occasions under the belief that Sora has replaced him with new friends. As the group travels to Hollow Bastion and defeat Maleficent, Riku becomes possessed by Ansem, who reveals that Kairi's heart is in Sora's body. To save Kairi, Sora impales himself with Ansem's Keyblade, briefly transforming him into a Heartless before Kairi restores Sora to human form. After taking Kairi to safety, Sora, Donald, and Goofy defeat Ansem at the open door to Kingdom Hearts. From inside the door, Mickey and Riku help Sora and his friends close it to prevent the Heartless within from escaping, with Mickey and Sora using their Keyblades to lock the door. Separated from their friends again, Sora, Donald and Goofy continue their quest to reunite with Riku and Mickey.
 
In Kingdom Hearts: Chain of Memories, Sora's group stumbles upon a fortress known as Castle Oblivion, where Naminé is forced by the group Organization XIII to manipulate their memories in order to turn Sora into their slave. After Sora and friends defeat the Organization members controlling the castle, Naminé helps restore the trio's memories to their state prior to entering Castle Oblivion, at the cost of their memories of the events in the castle. This requires them to sleep in the castle for the restoration of memories to be completed.
 
In Kingdom Hearts II, Sora reawakens along with Donald and Goofy in Twilight Town once his Nobody, Roxas, merges within him. They visit Mickey's master, Yen Sid, from whom they are reacquainted with Organization XIII. Sora embarks with Donald and Goofy to find Riku and King Mickey, traversing new and unfamiliar worlds to eliminate the threat of the remaining Heartless, Nobodies, and local villains. Learning that the Organization has abducted Kairi to force Sora to gather more hearts for them, Sora's group rejoins Mickey and arrives at the Organization's fortress in the World That Never Was, where they reunite with Kairi and Riku. After being separated from the others, Sora and Riku defeat Xemnas, after which a doorway appears that allows them to reunite with their friends on the Destiny Islands.
 
Sora makes a minor appearance in Kingdom Hearts 358/2 Days, the majority of which is set as he sleeps to recover his lost memories from the events of Chain of Memories; it is also established that Xion, an experimental replica of Roxas created by the Organization, inadvertently hinders the restoration process until she joins with him. In Kingdom Hearts Coded, a computer program based on Sora's likeness serves as the primary protagonist of the game, finding out the truth behind a mysterious message found inside Jiminy's journal. A four-year-old Sora appears in the prequel, Kingdom Hearts Birth by Sleep; after Ventus, one of the protagonists, has his heart damaged following a confrontation with his dark side, Vanitas, his heart finds its way into Sora, who accepts it into his own heart. In the game's secret ending, set after the events of Kingdom Hearts II, Ansem the Wise tells Aqua about Sora's adventures, and how he may help all the people connected to him. In the final scene, Sora decides to save them after reading Mickey's letter.
 
In Kingdom Hearts 3D: Dream Drop Distance, Sora and Riku undertake a Mark of Mastery exam in response to Xehanort's return. The two are sent to awaken several worlds submerged in sleep after the defeat of Ansem. Sora is lured into a deep slumber by Xehanort's incarnations, who plan to turn him into a vessel for Xehanort's heart. Riku and his friends save Sora and bring him back to Yen Sid's tower, where Riku dives into Sora's heart and awakens him. Because of Sora's failure, he does not achieve the rank of Keyblade Master. In the ending of Kingdom Hearts 0.2 Birth by Sleep – A Fragmentary Passage, Yen Sid reveals that Sora has lost most of his powers as a consequence of Xehanort's attempted possession, and advises Sora to seek out Hercules, who has gone through a similar experience.
 
In Kingdom Hearts III, Sora goes on a journey to regain his strength, particularly the  required to restore the hearts of Ventus, Aqua, and Terra while also looking for a chance to restore Roxas. Sora engages prepares with Master Xehanort and the thirteen seekers from the new Organization XIII. Although Sora's missions end in failures, upon finding Vanitas' body, Sora manages to properly use his strength and restore Ventus. Sora and the other Keyblade wielders go to Graveyard of their predecessors to fight Xehanort but are nearly killed by the amount of Heartless. After being restored by Namine, Sora uses his Power of Waking to give his friends another chance with Kairi's help. After their return to the graveyard, Sora manages to restore Terra and defeat the Organization with the group. However, the original Xehanort kills Kairi, causing him to track him to his hometown where Xehanort accepts defeat after as he goes to the afterlife, giving Sora his χ-blade. Sora uses his power of waking to restore Kairi despite learning the risks of its overuse, which causes him to fade from existence.

In the aftermath, as depicted in the Kingdom Hearts III Re Mind DLC, Sora finds himself in the Final World, where he is accosted by a young man, Yozora, who claims he was sent to save him. The two end up in a different world, Quadratum, where they engage in a fierce battle in which Sora emerges victorious; if defeated, Sora transforms into a crystal statue. In the rhythm action game Kingdom Hearts: Melody of Memory, Kairi recalls Sora's adventures in a dream world she creates within her own heart to search for clues for his whereabouts. Towards the end of her dream, Kairi confronts an illusion of Xehanort, who nearly overpowers her until Sora remotely takes control of her body and defeats him.
 
A 2D cartoonish avatar version of Sora wearing his original outfit in Kingdom Hearts is also present in the online community-based social gaming networking service, Kingdom Hearts Mobile.

Sora appears in the Kingdom Hearts 4 trailer fighting a giant Heartless in the world of Quadratum.

Other appearances
Outside Kingdom Hearts, Sora appeared as free limited-time downloadable content in the Final Fantasy crossover game World of Final Fantasy in January 2017. In 2019, Sora appeared in the mobile game Disney Emoji Blitz to commemorate the release of Kingdom Hearts III. Sora appears as a playable character in the Nintendo Switch crossover fighting game Super Smash Bros. Ultimate via downloadable content, which was released on October 18, 2021.

Sora also appears in various Kingdom Hearts media adaptations, including a manga series written by Shiro Amano and a series of novels by Tomoko Kanemaki, which adapt his role in the video games. In a collaboration between Square Enix and Japanese fashion brand SuperGroupies, Sora's image was used to create clothing based on his design from Kingdom Hearts III.

Reception

Popularity
Sora's character was very well received by gaming media. In January 2010, Famitsu featured Sora as its readers' fifth most popular character of all time. They also featured him on its issue #1105 cover, showing his many appearances through the years. UGO Networks placed Sora nineteenth on their list of "Top 25 Japanese RPG Characters" calling him a "charismatic and visually interesting" character. Although he did not make to the top ten of Electronic Gaming Monthlys "Top Ten: List of Videogame Characters", Sora was nevertheless noted for his growing popularity. In an ASCII Media Works poll in which fans voted selected whose video game or manga character would like to name their children after, Sora's name was second in the male category. In a Famitsu poll from 2011, Sora was voted as the most popular Kingdom Hearts character, with his fight against Roxas from Kingdom Hearts II also being listed as the best scene from the series. GamesRadar staff ranked Sora as 53rd on their "100 best heroes in video games", published in 2013. In 2016, Glixel staff ranked Sora as the 30th most iconic video game character of the 21st century. In 2019, Chris Penwell of PlayStation LifeStyle named Sora as his favorite character for having "A relatable personality." He was also placed 15th in the Game Informer poll of best characters from the 2000s. Sora has the most appearances as hero in Square Enix RPGs, according to Guinness World Recordss "The records held by Gamer's Edition 2020 cover characters". In 2021, HobbyConsolas also included Sora on their "The 30 best heroes of the last 30 years."

Various types of merchandising have been released based on Sora's character. There are several types of action figures which show Sora with a different appearance such as his original form, the Kingdom Hearts II design and others variants. Other accessories include plush, keychains, boots, necklaces, cube, nendoroid, phone charm straps and phone cases. In October 2021, during the reveal of the 20th Anniversary of the Kingdom Hearts trailer, an Ichiban Kuji-based Sora merchandise was made, and is set to be released in 2022. In that same year, Square Enix also made a tote bag and tamagotchi, depicting Sora.

Critical response
Critics and fans have generally praised Sora. When Sora was first revealed in 2002, GameSpots Giancarlo Varanini regarded him as "an appropriate amalgamation of the Square and Disney universes." He also comically noted that Sora "doesn't look like much, but you know how it goes." A 1UP.com writer called Sora "one of my all-time favorite Square characters", praising his cheerful personality. Gamasutra commented on Sora's journey along the series in their feature "The Birth of Collecting: The Osiris Archetype In Games" by Jason Johnson; while comparing Sora with Isis, Johnson found Sora's adventure appealing. IGN praised Sora's resilient character, noting how such an ordinary "youngster" could face up to his challenges during his adventures for the sake of friendship, while RPGFans Nicole Monet Kirk labelled him as an "extremely likable hero". Furthermore, in the book "Interactive Storytelling for Video Games: A Player-Centered Approach to Creating Memorable Characters and Stories", it is noted that while Sora follows a "standard hero archetype", his character becomes more believable and strong when worrying about his friends' fates. Louis Bedigian from GameZone mentioned that "Sora had something rarely found in video-game characters: depth" also praising his role in Kingdom Hearts. Game Informers Bryan Vore found that in Kingdom Hearts II, Osment has improved in voicing the character, praising his work. He was third in 1UP.coms "Top 5 Most Irritating RPG Protagonists" with writer Bob Mackey commenting he is "a human version of Mickey Mouse", criticizing his original outfit and relationship with Riku and Kairi, and finding him to be less popular than the Disney characters featured in the series.

Sora's transformations in the various Disney worlds in Kingdom Hearts II were commented to be entertaining by Julia Reges from AllGame due to how varied they are. Also reviewing Kingdom Hearts II, Greg Bemis from G4TV praised Sora's development in the game, including his growth and the fact each of his attacks from the title are entertaining. Although Computer and Video Games also found an improvement in Sora's movements due to sequences made with the Reaction Commands, they found them "fairly straightforward." RPGamers Cortney Stone stated that Sora now moved "like an acrobatic honed fighter" in contrast to his "adolescent awkwardness" seen in the first Kingdom Hearts, and remarked on Sora's transformation into a lion seen in the sequel as enjoyable. His new outfit was also well received by GameSpy, who found it to be an improvement from the original one that looked like a "wardrobe from Mickey Mouse's closet". GamesRadar had similar opinions and particularly focused on Sora's transformation and his new abilities. Game Informer viewed Sora's Drive Forms as well as his combined techniques with other characters as one of the best additions to the gameplay. Sora also received negative comments regarding his characterization. In January 2007, Sora was listed the fourth "biggest dork" of 2006 by Game Informer, citing the Atlantica singing portions of the second main game.

Although IGN also praised Sora's growth in Kingdom Hearts II in their article "Kingdom Hearts III: The IGN Concept", they stated that in order to make his role in a future sequel more entertaining, he would need more development making him "be confident, collected and committed to the tasks at hand". Both IGN and Anime News Network said Sora and Riku's stories in Dream Drop Distance were just a preparation for their growth in Kingdom Hearts III. Also commenting on his role in a future sequel, GamesRadar stated that having Sora's character older would be necessary to make the story more mature, but Allegra Frank of Polygon felt that Sora's characterization in Kingdom Hearts III was "off". In retrospect, Paste Magazine found Sora's story and links with his two similar other selves to be confusing. Wired regarded Sora as a hero who can make anything possible and wanted this to be done again in Kingdom Hearts III, hoping him to remain his likable traits. Critics panned the relationship between Sora and Kairi, criticizing the latter's continued role as a damsel in distress to be rescued by the former, rather than an ally. RPGamer criticized Sora's hero's journey for being downplayed in contrast to the final worlds. Sora's fate in the ending was the subject of analysis due to his apparent death after saving Kairi to the point GameRevolution stated that Kingdom Hearts III did not give the audience the happy ending they expected despite ending Xehanort's arc. With the end of Re Mind, GameInformer said Sora's characterization has been poor as he does not really go through a character arc despite appearing in several games to the point he is still a comic relief comparable to Ash Ketchum from Pokemon and Riku instead comes across more developed protagonist but as a result of tragedy which he does not want Sora to undergo.

Sora was a popular choice for inclusion in the Super Smash Bros. roster among fans and numerous websites, including Screen Rant, GamingBolt, Shacknews, IGN, and Siliconera; although Jeremy Winslow of Kotaku opposed him because the roster already included too many sword-wielding characters, he later admitted that Sora was "kinda cool". Kyle Campbell of USA Today and Wesley Leblanc of Game Informer both praised the character's inclusion, stating that Sora's addition "is a big deal" and "perfect". 

Upon the reveal of the first Kingdom Hearts IV trailer during April 2022, Polygon noted that there were several fans of the character wanting to know the true location of Sora's apartment from the world of Quadratum which is heavily based on Shibuya, Japan. This led to the discovery that it was in the Regno Raffine building of Aoyama, Tokyo which Polygon found wealthy for the idea of Sora living there. Sora's new shoes were also shown, and fans had mixed reactions to it and the loss of his clown shoes.

There have also been comments focused on Sora's voice actors, with Haley Joel Osment, Sora's English voice actor, being praised by the media. Gaming Targets Matt Swidder, who mentioned Osment "makes a perfect fit for Sora". On the other hand, Osment's work in Re:Chain of Memories was noted to have made a poor impact in his portrayal as the young lead, as he no longer sounds like in the original Kingdom Hearts game. Louis Bedigian from GameZone remarked on Osment's continuous work in the sequel Kingdom Hearts II. RPGamer still praised Osment's performance in the game, still finding him suitable for the protagonist. Koinya lamented the fact Miyu Irino's work was never made available for the Western audience, considering him talented alongside Mamoru Miyano (Riku).

References

Further reading

Characters designed by Tetsuya Nomura
Cryonically preserved characters in video games
Fictional explorers in video games
Fictional helmsmen
Fictional knights in video games
Japanese mascots
Kingdom Hearts original characters
Male characters in video games
Shapeshifter characters in video games
Square Enix protagonists
Super Smash Bros. fighters
Teenage characters in video games
Video game characters introduced in 2002
Video game characters who use magic
Video game mascots
Fictional swordfighters in video games